Lucy Beresford is an English broadcaster, presenter, novelist, and psychotherapist.

Biography
Beresford has an M.A. in Psychotherapy awarded by the City University, London, and an Advanced Diploma in Integrative Psychotherapy, having studied for both at Regent's College School of Psychotherapy and Counselling Psychology, London. She is registered with the United Kingdom Council for Psychotherapy (UKCP). She sees patients for the Priory Hospital, Roehampton, and privately in central London. She also has a degree in English literature from the University of Durham and was a member of the Durham Revue sketch comedy group, The Durham Revue.

Beresford’s initial career was in finance, with Shearson Lehman Brothers and BZW.

She was the agony aunt for Healthy magazine and, before that, for 5 years at Psychologies.

Beresford is an Agony Aunt on ITV's This Morning, hosts Love Decoded for eHarmony and is LBC's 'naughty Mary Poppins' having hosted their weekly 'Sex & Relationships' phone-in show since 2015. She blogs for Huffington Post UK Lifestyle  and was shortlisted for ‘Dating Expert of the Year 2015′ by UK Dating Awards. She is on the Faculty of The School of Life and is a Fellow of the RSA.

Beresford reviews contemporary fiction for a variety of British publications including The Spectator, the New Statesman, The Literary Review and The Sunday Telegraph. She appears frequently in the national international media, providing psychological insights into topical questions, propounding her behaviorist views on state enforced medication, recommending incentivization by punishment, and her appearances include the Jeremy Vine Show on BBC Radio 2, CNN, Daily Politics on BBC2, BBC Breakfast on BBC1, This Morning on ITV, NewsTalk on Channel 5, and Woman's Hour and the Today programme on BBC Radio 4.

Bibliography

References

External links
 Official website

1964 births
Living people
English women novelists
Alumni of Trevelyan College, Durham
The School of Life people
Alumni of City, University of London